Scoparia ulmaya is a moth in the family Crambidae. It was described by Harrison Gray Dyar Jr. in 1929. It is found on the West Indies, where it has been recorded from Guadeloupe.

The wingspan is about 10 mm. The forewings are brown with a slight bronzy reflection. The lines are pale and there is a round black spot, as well as a thick rectangular black dash. The spaces between the marks are filled with brown and there are two black terminal patches. Adults have been recorded on wing in July.

References

Moths described in 1929
Scorparia